Emerson Middle School may refer to the following schools in the United States:

Emerson Community Charter School, formerly formerly Ralph Waldo Emerson Middle School, Los Angeles
Emerson Middle School (Illinois)
Emerson High School (Union City, New Jersey)
Emerson Middle School (Michigan)